State Route 176 (SR 176) is a primary state highway in the U.S. state of Virginia. Known for most of its length as Parksley Road, the state highway runs  from SR 316 in Parksley east to U.S. Route 13 (US 13) at Centerville in central Accomack County.

Route description

SR 176 begins at an intersection with SR 316 (Cassatt Avenue) in the center of the town of Parksley. Bennett Street continues west as SR 673 toward Justisville. SR 176 heads southeast as a two-lane undivided road and has a grade crossing of an inactive railroad line immediately to the east of SR 316, passing to the south of the Eastern Shore Railway Museum before exiting the town. The state highway follows Parksley Road southeast from the town limit to the route's eastern terminus at US 13 (Lankford Highway) in the hamlet of Centerville.

Major intersections

References

External links

Virginia Highways Project: VA 176

176
State Route 176